Andrea Wolf (Kurdish nickname: , January 15, 1965, in Munich – October 23, 1998, in Çatak, Van province, Turkey) was a radical leftist activist. She was a PKK militant. She was killed while fighting with the PKK in 1998. Before her death, Wolf had been implicated in some revolutionary activities, and was accused of being part of the Red Army Faction from Germany. The Andrea Wolf case is the focus of a short film by Hito Steyerl called November.

External links
"Im Dschungel der Städte, in den Bergen Kurdistans…, Leben und Kampf von Andrea Wolf". Selbstverlag, Berlin 1999. 
Wie starb Andrea Wolf? Europäischer Gerichtshof für Menschenrechte verurteilt Türkei 
  

1965 births
1998 deaths
German activists
German women activists
Members of the Kurdistan Workers' Party
People from Munich
Apoists
Women in 20th-century warfare